Eric E. Hagedorn (August 21, 1896June 22, 1963) was an American politician and electrical engineer who served one term as a member of the Wisconsin State Assembly.  A Republican, he represented the city and town of Wauwatosa, Wisconsin, and northwestern Milwaukee County.

Early life and education
Born in Milwaukee, Wisconsin, Hagedorn graduated from Milwaukee Lutheran High School in 1912. He attended the Milwaukee School of Engineering from 1913 to 1915, and took a correspondence course in law.

Career

He served in the United States Navy and was commander of the 8th battalion at Great Lakes Naval Station for two and a half years.  Outside the Navy, he worked as an electrical engineer, working as superintendent of the Jung Electric Company, a sales manager for the Electrical Equipment Company, and manager and secretary of the Airforce Corporation.

He was elected Town Council President for the Town of Wauwatosa, and, in 1940, chose to challenge incumbent Republican Assemblyman Walter Nortman in the Republican primary.  Hagedorn won a stunning upset in the primary, but the Milwaukee County Republican Party disavowed the results, stating that Hagedorn was not a "bona fide Republican."  The County Party endorsed Nortman, who ran in the general election as an Independent Republican.  Hagedorn won the general election anyway, taking 47% of the vote in a four-candidate race.  Hagedorn ran for re-election in 1942, but was defeated in the Republican primary by Milton F. Burmaster.

During his one term in the Assembly, Hagedorn served on the Assembly Committee on Education and the Committee on Commerce and Manufactures.

Personal life 
Hagedorn died of cancer on June 22, 1963, at Park Falls, Wisconsin, where he had lived for eight years prior to his death. He was interred at Two Lakes Cemetery in the city of Phillips, Wisconsin, in Price County.

Electoral history

Wisconsin Assembly (1940, 1942)

| colspan="6" style="text-align:center;background-color: #e9e9e9;"| Republican Primary, September 1940

| colspan="6" style="text-align:center;background-color: #e9e9e9;"| General Election, November 5, 1940

| colspan="6" style="text-align:center;background-color: #e9e9e9;"| Republican Primary, September 1942

References

External links
 

1896 births
1963 deaths
Politicians from Milwaukee
People from Park Falls, Wisconsin
Military personnel from Milwaukee
Milwaukee School of Engineering alumni
American electrical engineers
20th-century American politicians
20th-century American engineers
Deaths from cancer in Wisconsin
Republican Party members of the Wisconsin State Assembly